A hat'h (hath, hand, cubit, moolum or mulam) is an obsolete unit of length in India equal to 24 angli (approximately 18 inches) or 2 hat'h to a gaz (approximately 1 yard). The unit was used in Mumbai (formerly Bombay) and in Bengal After metrication in the mid-20th century, the unit became obsolete.

See also
List of customary units of measurement in South Asia

References

External links

Units of length
Customary units in India
Obsolete units of measurement